Alexis Irénée du Pont Bayard (February 11, 1918 – September 3, 1985) was an American lawyer and politician from Rockland, near Greenville, in New Castle County, Delaware. A member of the Democratic Party, he served as the 13th Lieutenant Governor of Delaware from 1949 to 1953 and ran unsuccessfully for the United States Senate in 1952.

Early life

Bayard was born in Wilmington, Delaware, son of U.S. Senator Thomas F. Bayard Jr. and Elizabeth Bradford du Pont Bayard. He was named after his maternal great-grandfather, Alexis Irénée du Pont. Bayard was the scion of two prominent Delaware families. On his father's side, Alexis descended from the politically powerful Bayard family. The Bayards had long been bulwarks of Delaware's Democratic Party, with each of the previous five generations of the Bayard family having represented Delaware in the United States Senate. Bayard's mother, Elizabeth Bradford du Pont, was the daughter of Alexis Irénée du Pont Jr., granddaughter of Alexis Irénée du Pont, and great-granddaughter of Eleuthère Irénée du Pont. He was the founder of E.I. du Pont de Nemours and Company, the gunpowder and chemicals company that grew to dominate northern Delaware in the early twentieth century. By this time the du Ponts were a large and enormously wealthy family, many of whom were involved in the political life of Delaware.

Bayard attended St. Paul's School in Concord, New Hampshire. He graduated from Princeton University in 1940. He later attended the University of Virginia School of Law and was admitted to the bar in 1948.

Career

World War II
During World War II, he served in the United States Marine Corps. He was wounded during the Battle of Iwo Jima.

Political career

A war era veteran with a well-known name, the 30-year-old Bayard was elected lieutenant governor in 1948, defeating Republican Chester V. Townsend Jr. of Dagsboro, who was speaker of the Delaware House of Representatives. He served as lieutenant governor from January 20, 1949, until January 15, 1953. In 1948 he also served as an alternate delegate to the Democratic National Convention.

Bayard lost a bid for a seat in the United States Senate in 1952 to the incumbent Republican U.S. Senator John J. Williams. Bayard's inexperience and aristocratic roots compared unfavorably to Williams' "rags-to-riches" rise from chicken farmer to national figure. These factors, along with Williams' reputation for honesty, integrity, fairness, and bipartisanship in the U.S. Senate and the popularity of the Republicans' U.S. presidential candidate, Dwight D. Eisenhower, led the incumbent to a ten-point victory over Bayard at the polls.

After his defeat by Williams, Bayard resumed his law practice in Wilmington and remained an active supporter of the Democratic Party. In 1954, he served as campaign chairman of the Delaware Democratic Committee. In 1967, he became the state Democratic chairman. In 1970, he became a member of the finance committee of the Democratic National Committee and held this position until his death.

In 1961 he joined what had been the Herrmann & Duffy law firm in Wilmington; at the time of his death the firm was Bayard, Handelman & Murdoch.

Personal life
He married Jane Brady Hildreth on April 24, 1944. He had six children: Alexis I., Eugene H., Richard H., John F., William B. and Jane H.

He was known as "Lex" in his law practice.

Death
Bayard died in Philadelphia, Pennsylvania, on September 3, 1985, during heart-bypass surgery at Graduate Hospital. He was buried at the Old Swedes Episcopal Church Cemetery in Wilmington, Delaware, alongside his father, grandfather, and great-grandfather.

Legacy
Bayard was the last member of his line to be elected to public office, thus ending a six-generation tradition. After his death, the Alexis I. du Pont Bayard Award was created for distinguished service to the party. His son, Richard H. Bayard, has served as chairman of the Delaware Democratic Party.

Almanac
Elections are held the first Tuesday after November 1. The lieutenant governor takes office the third Tuesday of January and has a four-year term.

References

Further reading

Delaware Historical Society; website; 505 North Market Street, Wilmington, Delaware 19801; (302) 655-7161
University of Delaware; Library website; 181 South College Avenue, Newark, Delaware 19717; (302) 831-2965

External links
Delaware's Lieutenant Governors 

The Political Graveyard  
Time magazine October 13, 1952, via Internet Archive

 

1918 births
1985 deaths
Alexis
Du Pont family
American Episcopalians
People from Wilmington, Delaware
Princeton University alumni
University of Virginia School of Law alumni
Delaware lawyers
Delaware Democrats
Lieutenant Governors of Delaware
20th-century American lawyers
20th-century American politicians
Christians from Delaware
United States Marines
United States Marine Corps personnel of World War II